At least two ships of the Royal Netherlands Navy have been named HNLMS Johan Maurits van Nassau after John Maurice of Nassau:

 , a gunboat launched in 1932 and sunk in 1940
 , a  laid down as HMS Ribble, launched in 1943 and renamed on transfer to the Netherlands Navy. She was broken up in 1959

Royal Netherlands Navy ship names